The Central Guard Bureau of the General Office of the Chinese Communist Party, also nominally affiliated with the army and the police as the Guard Bureau of the Joint Staff Department of the Central Military Commission and the Ninth Bureau of the Ministry of Public Security respectively, is the organization responsible for the protection of senior party members, their families, and important foreign dignitaries in the People's Republic of China. It has been widely called the Central Guard Bureau (CGB) since the Cultural Revolution. The bureau selects and controls the bodyguards of protectees; bodyguards are typically trained by the People's Liberation Army (PLA). The CGB is part of the internal security apparatus as protectees are constantly under surveillance by their bureau-selected bodyguards.

The CGB effectively controls the PLA Ground Force Beijing Garrison's Central Guard Corps (PLA Unit 61889, formerly known as the Central Guard Regiment), an elite security unit, by having bureau deputy directors in leadership positions in the unit.

References

Citations

Sources 
 Books

 

Specialist law enforcement agencies of China
Protective security units